The 1975 Washington State Cougars football team was an American football team that represented Washington State University in the Pacific-8 Conference (Pac-8) during the 1975 NCAA Division I football season. In their eighth season under head coach Jim Sweeney, the Cougars compiled a  record  in Pac-8, last) and were outscored 295 to 262.

The team's statistical leaders included John Hopkins with 1,022 passing yards, Vaughn Williams with 662 rushing yards, and Brian Kelly with 371 receiving yards.

With two wins to open the season, followed by seven consecutive losses, the Cougars took out their frustrations on over-matched neighbor Idaho in the Battle of the Palouse on  scoring eight touchdowns in the first half on the way to an  The next week at Husky Stadium in Seattle, WSU led rival Washington  with three minutes left in Don James' first Apple Cup, but gave up two long touchdowns to lose by 

Sweeney resigned a week  and was promptly hired at 

This was the first season for the concrete north grandstand at Martin Stadium; the student section, it was formerly a wooden grandstand constructed in the 1930s as part of Rogers Field. (1975 aerial photo)

Schedule

Roster

Game summaries

Washington

NFL Draft
Four Cougars were selected in the 1976 NFL Draft

References

External links
 Game program: WSU at Utah – September 20, 1975
 Game program: California at WSU – September 27, 1975
 Game program: Oregon at WSU – November 1, 1975
 Game program: Idaho at WSU – November 15, 1975

Washington State
Washington State Cougars football seasons
Washington State Cougars football